The 2021–22 Nigeria Professional Football League was the 51st season of Nigeria's top-flight association football league and the 32nd since attaining professionalism. The season started on 17 December 2021 and was concluded on 17 July 2022.

This season saw Shooting Stars returning to the top-flight after a four-year hiatus, likewise Niger Tornadoes who won the National League play-offs. They were also joined by Remo Stars and Gombe United after securing promotion from the second division. Akwa United were the defending champions.

On 25 June 2022, Rivers United won their first league title with 4 matches to spare.

Kano Pillars were relegated for the first time in 20 years.This occurred as a result of the team suffering a six point deduction from the league committee and the club's poor form during the season, they were joined by MFM, Heartland and Katsina United. Remo Stars secured a continental ticket for the first time in the club's history.

Teams information

Clubs 
Note: Several clubs played home matches at other stadiums due to their regular stadia not meeting the league requirements or being banished by the LMC.

Managerial changes 
Not including interim management.

League table

Results

Positions by round

Results by matches played

Statistics

Scoring

Top scorers

Hat-tricks

Notes
(H) – Home team

References

Nigeria Professional Football League seasons
2021–22 in Nigerian football
Nigeria
2021 in African football
2022 in African football